Kilians were a German indie rock band. They started out as a loose group of music mad students from Dinslaken, Germany. In 2005, the band's line-up stabilised and they recorded their first self-titled EP. In the following year their song 'Jealous Lover' reached number 3 of the German CampusCharts.

In 2006, Thees Uhlmann of Tomte discovered Kilians and invited them to support his band on their spring tour. On this tour Kilians sold 700 copies of their EP. Uhlmann later became Kilians' manager.

In August 2006, Kilians toured Germany in a bus sponsored by Austrian energy drink manufacturer Red Bull. They played several small guerrilla gigs on camping sites adjacent to various music festivals.

When the band released their first professionally merchandised EP 'Fight the Start' on 17 April 2007, the band changed their name, which is derived from a character of Carl Zuckmayer's play The Captain of Köpenick (play), from 'The Kilians' to 'Kilians'.

In summer 2007, Kilians once again toured Germany and played at Rock am Ring and other festivals.

The band’s debut album Kill the Kilians was released on 7 September 2007 and reached number 75 of the official German music charts.

Their second album They Are Calling Your Name was released on 10 April 2009. It reached number 32 of the German albums charts and spent two weeks in the charts.

In January 2013, the group disbanded.

Discography

Albums

Singles

References
Biography on laut.de

External links
Official website
 Kilians at Last.fm

German musical groups
German indie rock groups